Debbie Jessika Mucarsel-Powell (born January 18, 1971) is an Ecuadorian-born American politician and academic administrator who served as a U.S. representative for  from 2019 to 2021. A member of the Democratic Party, her district covered the western part of Miami-Dade County, including Homestead, as well as the Florida Keys. Mucarsel-Powell was the first Ecuadorian American and first South American-born immigrant to serve as a member of the U.S. House and the U.S. Congress.

Murcarsel-Powell was defeated in her 2020 re-election bid by Miami-Dade County mayor Carlos Giménez.

Early life and education 
Mucarsel-Powell was born in Guayaquil, Ecuador, and raised in Miami, the daughter of Imelda Gil and Guido Mucarsel Yunes. Mucarsel-Powell immigrated to the United States when she was 14 years old, with her mother and three older sisters. She began working in a doughnut shop and continued to work to help support her family, who shared a one bedroom apartment.

Mucarsel-Powell attended Pomona Catholic High School in Pomona, California. She earned a Bachelor of Arts degree in political science from Pitzer College and a Master of Arts in international political economy from Claremont Graduate University.

Earlier career 
Mucarsel-Powell worked for non-profits like the Hope Center, Zoo Miami Foundation, and the Coral Restoration Foundation. From 2003 to 2007, she served as the director of development at Florida International University (FIU). She was the associate vice president for advancement at the FIU Herbert Wertheim College of Medicine from 2007 to 2011. Mucarsel-Powell became an associate dean at the FIU Herbert Wertheim College of Medicine.

Mucarsel-Powell volunteered for the presidential campaigns of John Kerry and Barack Obama. In 2016, she ran unsuccessfully against Anitere Flores for the Florida Senate.

U.S. House of Representatives

Elections

2018 

She defeated veteran Demetries Grimes in the Democratic Party primary election, receiving 63.5% of the vote.

In the November 6 general election, Mucarsel-Powell defeated Curbelo, receiving 50.9% of the vote, becoming the first Ecuadorian-born person to be elected to the United States Congress and the first woman to represent Florida's 26th congressional district.

2020 

Mucarsel-Powell was defeated for re-election by the Republican nominee, Miami-Dade County Mayor Carlos A. Giménez.

Tenure 

On December 18, 2019, Mucarsel-Powell voted to impeach President Donald Trump.

Committee assignments 

 Committee on the Judiciary
Subcommittee on Crime, Terrorism and Homeland Security
Subcommittee on Immigration and Citizenship
 Committee on Transportation and Infrastructure
Subcommittee on Economic Development, Public Buildings and Emergency Management
Subcommittee on Water Resources and Environment

Source: Clerk of the House of Representatives

Caucus memberships 

Congressional Caucus for Women's Issues
Congressional Hispanic Caucus
Congressional LGBT Equality Caucus
Congressional Progressive Caucus
New Democrat Coalition

Post-congressional career
In April 2021, Mucarsel-Powell joined Giffords as a senior adviser, with the goal of lobbying the U.S. Senate to pass the Bipartisan Background Checks Act of 2021.

Electoral history

Personal life 
Mucarsel-Powell is of Ecuadorian and Lebanese ancestry. When she was 24 years old, her father was killed outside of his home in Ecuador by a gunman. She and her husband, Robert Powell, have three children. Powell is a Roman Catholic.

See also

List of Arab and Middle Eastern Americans in the United States Congress
List of Hispanic and Latino Americans in the United States Congress
Women in the United States House of Representatives

References

External links

 

1971 births
21st-century American politicians
21st-century American women politicians
American academic administrators
American politicians of Ecuadorian descent
American politicians of Lebanese descent
American Roman Catholics
American university and college faculty deans
Candidates in the 2016 United States elections
Catholics from Florida
Claremont Graduate University alumni
Ecuadorian emigrants to the United States
Democratic Party members of the United States House of Representatives from Florida
Female members of the United States House of Representatives
Florida International University faculty
Hispanic and Latino American members of the United States Congress
Living people
People from Guayaquil
Pitzer College alumni
Women deans (academic)
American women academics